Forward security could refer to:

Forward contract, a financial instrument
Forward secrecy a property of cryptographic protocols